Gallia Academy High School (GAHS) is a public high school near Gallipolis at Centenary, Ohio, United States.  It is the only high school in the Gallipolis City School District.  The boys' sports teams are known as the Blue Devils, while the girls' teams are called the Blue Angels.

History

GAHS was founded as a military academy in 1811. The first official location was constructed in 1936. The original high school building was converted to a junior high school after construction of new facilities in the 1950s.

In 2005, the local community voted and approved a proposal to build a new campus on Centenary Road outside of downtown Gallipolis. The current Gallia Academy High School was completed in 2009 and has been in use since August 24, 2009.

Athletics
The Gallipolis Gallia Academy Blue Devils will be a part of the Ohio Valley Conference, starting in 2016-17.

Notable alumni

 James B. Aleshire, U.S. Army major general
 Dave Roberts, Major League Baseball pitcher
 Marian Spencer, civil rights activist and former Vice-Mayor, Cincinnati,
 Tom Spencer, former MLB player (Chicago White Sox)
 Robert M. Switzer, US Representative from Ohio

References

External links
 
 Gallipolis City Schools

High schools in Gallia County, Ohio
Public high schools in Ohio